Hermeskeil is a city in the Trier-Saarburg district, in Rhineland-Palatinate, Germany. It is situated in the Hunsrück, approx. 25 km southeast of Trier. Its population is about 5,900.

Data

Hermeskeil is the seat of the Verbandsgemeinde ("collective municipality") Hermeskeil.

The old locomotive depot, Bahnbetriebswerk Hermeskeil is now a museum housing German steam engines.

The Flugausstellung aircraft museum displays more than 100 aircraft and is the largest private museum of that kind in Europe.

A Gaulish burial of the 1st century AD was discovered in a field near Hermeskeil in 2009.

A Roman castrum has been identified in 2015: it is the only castrum created by Julius Caesar inside Magna Germania, when he crossed the Rhine river in 53 BC

Wikipedia links
 Link to German page Hermeskeil
 Link to information page about Flugausstellung aircraft museum
 :de:Römerlager Hermeskeil

References

External links
 www.hermeskeil.de
 Websites in Hermeskeil
 Homepage of Flugausstellung aircraft museum

Towns in Rhineland-Palatinate
Trier-Saarburg